Ammineite is the first recognized mineral containing ammine groups. Its formula is [CuCl2(NH3)2]. The mineral is chemically pure. It was found in a guano deposit in Chile. At the same site other ammine-containing minerals were later found:

 Chanabayaite, CuCl(N3C2H2)(NH3)·0.25H2O (an alternative formula), a triazolate mineral
 Joanneumite, Cu(C3N3O3H2)2(NH3)2, an isocyanurate mineral
 Shilovite, Cu(NH3)4(NO3)2

Crystal structure
The characteristic features of the structure of ammineite are:
 layers of trans form of the copper complex, parallel to (001), connected by Cu-Cl bonds
 presence of CuN2Cl4 distorted octahedron ([4+2] coordination)
 edge-sharing of the octahedra produce zigzag chains along the [001] direction
 hydrogen bonds between NH3 and Cl atoms

Associated minerals
Ammineite coexists with atacamite, darapskite, halite and salammoniac.

Origin
Ammineite is supposed to be a result of an interaction of an earlier copper mineral, likely from a plutonic rock, with ammonia in guano. Ammonia may be produced in decomposition of compounds like urea or uric acid.

References

Copper(II) minerals
Orthorhombic minerals
Minerals in space group 63
Minerals described in 2010